Adur Burzen-Mihr (Middle Iranian) or Azar Barzin was an Atash Bahram (a Zoroastrian fire temple of the highest grade) located in Parthia. In the Sasanian period it was one of the three Great Fires and was associated with the farmer class; the other two were Adur Farnbag in Persis which was associated with the priest class, and Adur Gushnasp in Media, which was associated with the warrior class. Its establishment can be dated to the late 5th or early 4th century BC. Adur means "Holy Fire", and Burzēn-Mihr is a Parthian given name which literally means "Exalted is Mihr" and is probably the name of the temple's founder. 

This Fire is described in Bundahishn. Its location is given as Mount Rēvand (in Avestan: Raēvant), probably a spur of the Nishapur mountains in the district formerly known as Rēvand in Khurasan. An element of the name is preserved in the name of the nearby village Borzinan may. Another identification is Mount Mehr, five miles from the village Mehr on the Shahrud–Sabzevar Highway.
Some identify it with the Fire of Asaak.

The Fire is mentioned several times in Shahnameh as Mehr-Barzīn, Mehr, and Barzīn, and is used also as a simile for fiery fierceness.

The Fire is thought to have been a major center of pilgrimage, even after the Arsacids' fall. In the Sasanian period, although its name was always placed third in texts and the fire was associated with the lowliest class of the society, (farmers; the other two being warriors and priests), it still maintained its importance. Its history in the Islamic period is not known.

See also 
 Cypress of Kashmar
 Atashgah castle

References

M. Boyce, “ĀDUR BURZĒN-MIHR,” Encyclopædia Iranica, I/5, pp. 472-473; an updated version is available online at Welcome to Encyclopaedia Iranica (accessed on 28 February 2014).

Fire temples in Iran
Parthia
Lost buildings and structures
Religion in the Sasanian Empire
Sasanian architecture